The Legend of Sugisawa Village (杉沢村伝説) is a Japanese urban legend about a village that is said to have existed in Aomori Prefecture.

Legend 
There used to be a village called Sugisawa Village in the mountains of Aomori Prefecture. In the early Showa period (1926-1989), there was an incident in which one villager suddenly went mad, killed all the villagers, and took his own life. The empty village was incorporated into a neighboring village, became an abandoned village, and was erased from maps and official prefectural documents. However, the ruins of the village are said to still exist today as a home for evil spirits.

References 

Culture in Aomori Prefecture
Japanese urban legends